Dolichandrone arcuata, known in Malayalam as pambukaimaram, is a deciduous tree in the Bignoniaceae family. This species is native to the dry, deciduous forests of the Eastern Ghats in the Indian subcontinent.

Description

References

arcuata
Flora of India (region)